London University was a university constituency electing one Member of Parliament (MP) to the House of Commons of the Parliament of the United Kingdom, from 1868 to 1950.

Boundaries, electorate and history
This university constituency was created by the Reform Act 1867. The first election took place during the 1868 United Kingdom general election. The constituency returned one Member of Parliament, using the first past the post electoral system.

The constituency was not a physical area. Its electorate consisted of the graduates of the University of London. Before 1918 only male graduates qualified. From 1918 all graduates qualified, including women over thirty (reduced to twenty one when universal adult suffrage on equal terms was introduced before the 1929 United Kingdom general election).

The constituency was almost abolished in 1918. The original proposal of the Speaker's Conference, which considered electoral reform before the Representation of the People Act 1918 was enacted, was to combine all the English and Welsh universities except for Oxford and Cambridge into a three-member constituency. However, during consideration of the legislation it was agreed that London University should continue to return one member. The University of Wales was also given its own seat. The other universities, which were still to be combined, had their proposed representation reduced to two members.

All the university constituencies were abolished in 1950, by the Representation of the People Act 1948.

Members of Parliament
This is a list of people who have represented this university in the Parliament of the United Kingdom between 1868 and 1950.

Notes:-
 1 Lowe was elevated to the peerage as The 1st Viscount Sherbrooke.
 2 Lubbock was elevated to the peerage as The 1st Baron Avebury.
 3 Russell-Wells died on 14 July 1924 – the seat was vacant at dissolution.
 4 Graham-Little, as an Independent MP, supported the National Governments in office from 1931 until the formation of the wartime coalition in 1940. He also supported Winston Churchill's caretaker government in 1945 and his proposed continuation in office if he had won the 1945 election. Graham-Little is therefore classified as a National Independent MP from 1931.

Elections
General elections, from 1918 when most constituencies polled on the same day, were on different polling days from territorial constituencies. The polls for university constituencies were open for five days.

Coalition Conservative is considered to be equivalent to Conservative, as is National Independent equivalent to Independent.

Elections in the 1860s

Lowe was appointed Chancellor of the Exchequer in Gladstone's government.

Elections in the 1870s

Elections in the 1880s

Lowe was elevated to the peerage as the 1st Viscount Sherbrooke, causing a by-election.

Lubbock joined the breakaway Liberal Unionist Party in 1886.

This was a gain for the Liberal Unionist Party, but a hold for Lubbock personally.

Elections in the 1890s

Elections in the 1900s

Lubbock was elevated to the peerage as the 1st Baron Avebury, triggering a by-election.

Elections in the 1910s

The Liberal Unionist Party merged with the Conservative Party in 1912, but its former members continued to be known collectively as the Unionist Party. (They are not to be confused with the contemporary Unionist Party in Scotland, which also later merged with the Conservatives.)

Elections in the 1920s

Elections in the 1930s

Elections in the 1940s

See also
List of former United Kingdom Parliament constituencies

References

Bibliography
 Boundaries of Parliamentary Constituencies 1885–1972, compiled and edited by F.W.S. Craig (Parliamentary Reference Publications 1972)
 British Parliamentary Election Results 1832–1885, compiled and edited by F.W.S. Craig (Macmillan Press 1977)
 British Parliamentary Election Results 1885–1918, compiled and edited by F.W.S. Craig (Macmillan Press 1974)
 British Parliamentary Election Results 1918–1949, compiled and edited by F.W.S. Craig (Macmillan Press, revised edition 1977)
 Electoral Reform in War and Peace 1906–18, by Martin Pugh (Routledge & Kegan Paul 1978)
 Who's Who of British members of parliament: Volume I 1832–1885, edited by M. Stenton (The Harvester Press 1976)
 Who's Who of British members of parliament, Volume II 1886–1918, edited by M. Stenton and S. Lees (Harvester Press 1978)
 Who's Who of British members of parliament, Volume III 1919–1945, edited by M. Stenton and S. Lees (Harvester Press 1979)
 Who's Who of British members of parliament, Volume IV 1945–1979, edited by M. Stenton and S. Lees (Harvester Press 1981)
 

Historic parliamentary constituencies in England
University constituencies of the Parliament of the United Kingdom
Constituencies of the Parliament of the United Kingdom established in 1868
Constituencies of the Parliament of the United Kingdom disestablished in 1950
Parliament constituency